Southeast Delco School District is a midsized, regional suburban public school district located in Delaware County, Pennsylvania. The District encompasses approximately 10 km² (4 square miles). It serves the residents of Collingdale, Darby Township, Folcroft, and Sharon Hill. The district is adjacent to the City of Philadelphia. The District was created from the merging of smaller, local school districts. According to 2000 federal census data, it served a resident population of 30,732. In 2009, the district residents’ per capita income was $17,418, while the median family income was $47,321. In the Commonwealth, the median family income was $49,501 and the United States median family income was $49,445, in 2010.

Schools
Kindergarten Center (Darby Township)

Grades 1-8 Schools
Darby Township School (Darby Township)
Delcroft School (Folcroft)
Harris School (Collingdale)
Sharon Hill School (Sharon Hill)
Academy Park High School (Sharon Hill)

References

External links
Delaware County IU 25
Delaware County Technical High School
Delaware County Workforce Investment Board

School districts in Delaware County, Pennsylvania